Massive Appendage is an Australian metal band based around the McCormack brothers, Darren, Matt and Shawn using the aliases Jed Starr, Big Bird and Snuff Beastley. It is one of multiple highly connected bands involving the brothers, others being Kings Cross, Festers Fanatics and Starworld.

Massive Appendage
Massive Appendage, a heavy metal band, was formed in Sydney in 1986 by Jed Starr (guitar, vocals), Big Bird (guitar, vocals), Snuff Beastley (bass) and Venom Brown (drums). Oxx replaced Brown in 1989 and the band released a self-financed album The Severed Erection later that year with the album cover (painted by Kriss Hades of Sadistik Exekution) causing controversy.

Kings Cross
Kings Cross, a hard rock band, was first formed in the early 1980s in Los Angeles by Darren, Matt and Shawn McCormack where they released an EP. This version ended when the brothers returned to Australia. Kings Cross reformed in Australia with Jedd Starr, Snuff Beastley, Tubby Wadsworth (drums) and Marc "Cat Weazle" Welsh (guitar). They released and album, Psychedelic World, in 1989.

Festers Fanatics
Festers Fanatics, a punk rock band, was formed in Sydney in 1987 by Jedd Starr, Snuff Beastley, Tubby Wadsworth with Fester (Aldo Rubernik) on vocals. Marc Welsh joined on guitar and Oxx and Squire Anderson (bass) replaced Wadsworth and Beastley. The band released two albums What Choice Do We Have? and Fester Fanatics' Greatest Cocktail Party Hits and broke up in 1990. An EP, Great Aussie Demo, was released in 1986.

Starworld
Starworld was formed in 1992 by Jed Starr, Big Bird, Venom Brown and Anthony Ragg (bass, ex Kings of the Sun). in 1993 Marc Welsh took over from Ragg. They released an EP called Starworld '93 in 1993. In 1993 Brown and Ragg both joined Nick Barker's new band Barker.

Other bands
Wadsworth and Starr joined Killing Time in Melbourne in 1989 and 1990 respectively. Together they released two EPS before Wadsworh left in 1991. The band released a single before Starr left in early 1992. Killing Time later changed their name to Mantissa and continued on until disbanding in 1996.

Starr was a member of Jon Stevens's backing band, co-writing and appearing on his 1993 album Are U Satisfied along with Nick Barker.

Discography
Massive Appendage
The Severed Erection (1990) – Original

Fester Fanatics
What Choice Do We Have? (1988) – Original
Fester Fanatics' Greatest Cocktail Party Hits (1989) – Original
Great Aussie Demo EP (1988) – Original

Kings Cross
Kings Cross EP (1984)
Psychedelic World (1989) – Original

Starworld
Starworld '93 (1993)

References

Australian heavy metal musical groups
Musical groups established in 1986
Musical groups disestablished in 1990